Laxman Tudu (born 16 May 1965) is an Indian politician. He was a Member of Parliament of Lok Sabha during 15th Lok Sabha where he represented Mayurbhanj. In 2018, he quit Biju Janata Dal and joined Jharkhand Mukti Morcha.

See also
 Mayurbhanj (Lok Sabha constituency)
 Indian general election in Orissa, 2009
 Biju Janata Dal

References

People from Odisha
Odisha politicians
Biju Janata Dal politicians
India MPs 2009–2014
1965 births
Living people
Lok Sabha members from Odisha
People from Mayurbhanj district
Santali people
Jharkhand Mukti Morcha politicians